Events from the year 1763 in art.

Events
 In Venice
 Canaletto and Francesco Zuccarelli are elected to the Accademia di Belle Arti di Venezia.
 Francesco Guardi begins painting the 12 Doge's Feasts series.

Paintings
 François Boucher – The Judgement of Paris
 John Singleton Copley – Portraits of James Warren and Mercy Otis Warren
 Francesco Guardi – Miracle of a Dominican Saint (for San Pietro Martire (Murano))
 Matthäus Günther – Frescos in Benedictine Abbey Church of St. Marinus and St. Anianus, Rott am Inn
 George Stubbs (approximate date; Tate Britain)
 Horse Frightened by Lion
 Horse Devoured by a Lion
 Benjamin West – Cymon and Iphigenia (lost)
 Johann Zoffany – Three sons of the Earl of Bute

Births
 June 26 – George Morland, English painter of animals and rustic scenes (died 1804)
 July 22 – Johann Heinrich Ramberg, German painter and printmaker (died 1840)
 August 7 – Johann Jakob Biedermann, Swiss  painter and etcher (died 1830)
 November 19 – Karl Ludwig Fernow, art critic (died 1808)
 November 25 – Jean Germain Drouais, French historical painter (died 1788)
 December 12 – Margareta Alströmer, Swedish painter and singer and a member of the Royal Swedish Academy of Arts (died 1816)
 date unknown
 Pietro Bettelini, Italian engraver (died 1828)
 Antoine-Denis Chaudet, French sculptor in the neoclassical style (died 1810)
 Joseph-François Ducq, Flemish historical and portrait painter (died 1829)
 Augustin Félix Fortin, French painter of landscapes, and of genre and historical subjects (died 1832)
 Philippe Auguste Hennequin, French painter (died 1833)
 Andrew Plimer, English miniaturist (died 1837)
 Zacarías González Velázquez, Spanish painter (died 1834)
 Andries Vermeulen, Dutch painter (died 1814)

Deaths
 January 3 – Francesco Maria Schiaffino, Italian sculptor (born 1668)
 January 21 – Jean-François Oeben, cabinet-maker (born 1721)
 March 4 – Johan Hörner, Swedish-Danish painter (born 1711)
 April – Franz Xaver Feuchtmayer, German Baroque stucco plasterer of the Wessobrunner School (born 1698)
 April 18 – Franz Anton Bustelli, porcelain modeller (born 1723)
 May 24 – Luis González Velázquez, Spanish late-Baroque painter (born 1715)
 September 24 – Hendrik Frans van Lint, landscape painter from the Southern Netherlands (born 1684)
 October – Anna Maria Garthwaite, English textile designer (born 1688)
 October 22 – Frans van Mieris jr., Dutch painter (born 1689)
 December 3 – Giuseppe Nogari, Venetian painter of the Rococo, where he painted mainly painted half-body portraits (born 1699)
 date unknown
 Kim Du-ryang, Korean genre works painter of the mid Joseon period (born 1696)
 Carlo Salis, Italian painter, born in Verona (born 1680)
 Gervase Spencer, English miniaturist (born 1715)
 Jan van Gool, Dutch painter and biographer (born 1685)
 probable – Cao Xueqin, Chinese writer, painter of cliffs and rocks, poet (born 1715)

References

 
Years of the 18th century in art
1760s in art